Virgil Carl Gray (born March 7, 1984) is an arena football defensive back who is a free agent. He played college football for the University of Rhode Island.

Early life
Gray attended Therrell High School in Atlanta, Georgia and was a student and a standout in football and basketball. In football, he was a three-year letterman, and as a senior, he served as a team captain and was an All-City selection. Gray graduated in 2002.

College career
Gray continued his football career at the University of Rhode Island. As a freshman in 2002, Gray red-shirted. Gray would play the next 4 seasons for the Rams, lettering each season, and was named a Second-Team All-Atlantic 10 Conference selection as a senior in 2006.

Professional career

af2 years
In 2008, Gray signed with the Lubbock Renegades of af2. Gray played the competition of the 2008 season with the Renegades to a 9–7 record, and a berth in the af2 playoffs where they lost in the first round.

In 2009, Gray signed with the Spokane Shock after the Renegades folded. The Shock finished the season 15–1 and won, what happened to be the final, ArenaCup.

Milwaukee Iron
In 2010, Gray was assigned to the Milwaukee Iron, who had joined a number of other af2 teams in forming Arena Football 1.

Arizona Rattlers
In 2011, former Shock teammate Nick Davila, convinced Gray to join him on the Arizona Rattlers.

Pittsburgh Power
Gray signed with the Power on September 14, 2013.

In his first season with the Power, Gray missed 7 games due to a high ankle sprain but still finished with 42 tackles, 23 pass breakups and 11 interceptions returned for 297 yards and 2 touchdowns. Gray also returned 15 kickoffs for 344 yards and 1 touchdown.

San Jose SaberCats
Gray was assigned to the San Jose SaberCats on September 29, 2014.

Guangzhou Power
Gray was selected by the Guangzhou Power of the China Arena Football League (CAFL) in the fifteenth round of the 2016 CAFL Draft.

Baltimore Brigade
On March 21, 2018, Gray was assigned to the Baltimore Brigade.

Coaching career
On March 7, 2017, Gray was named to the Baltimore Brigade coaching staff as an assistant coach.

References

External links
Rhode Island Bio

1984 births
Living people
Players of American football from Atlanta
American football defensive backs
Canadian football defensive backs
American players of Canadian football
University of Rhode Island alumni
Rhode Island Rams football players
Spokane Shock players
Milwaukee Iron players
Arizona Rattlers players
Omaha Nighthawks players
Pittsburgh Power players
San Jose SaberCats players
Guangzhou Power players
Baltimore Brigade coaches
Baltimore Brigade players
Hamilton Tiger-Cats players